Darabi is a surname. Notable people with the surname include:

Delara Darabi (1986–2009), Iranian executed for murder
Homa Darabi (1940–1994), Iranian suicide
Moslem Darabi (born 1981), Iranian strongman
Parvin Darabi (born 1941), American activist